"50 Ways to Leave Your Lover" is a song by the American singer-songwriter Paul Simon. It was the second single from his fourth studio album, Still Crazy After All These Years (1975), released on Columbia Records. Backing vocals on the single were performed by Patti Austin, Valerie Simpson, and Phoebe Snow. The song features a recognizable repeated drum riff performed by drummer Steve Gadd.

One of his most popular singles, "50 Ways" was released in December 1975 and began to see chart success within the new year. It became Simon's sole number-one hit as a solo artist on the Billboard Hot 100 in the United States, and was his highest position in France, where it peaked at number two. Elsewhere, the song was a top 20 hit in Canada and New Zealand. The single was certified gold by the Recording Industry Association of America (RIAA), denoting sales of over one million copies.

Creation
Following Simon's divorce from first wife Peggy Harper, Simon opted to take a more humorous approach to document the event. He recorded the song in a small New York City studio on Broadway, and built the song around the drums in order to "avoid clutter".

Like in "American Tune" three years earlier, Simon found inspiration in classical music. The melody of the tune is based on "Tit er jeg glad"  (Danish: Often I am happy), a 1917 love song by the Danish composer Carl Nielsen.

Reception
Billboard called it an "excellent song" that has "very clever lyrics" and an "easy to listen to melody."  Cash Box said that it is "a clever, commercial song about the elasticity of love, how easy it is to pull away and equally easy to snap back with it." Record World said that the song "finds Simon aided by a crack team of sessionmen and the unmistakable vocals of Phoebe Snow."

Charts and certifications
"50 Ways to Leave Your Lover" was Paul Simon's biggest solo hit and broke in the US in late 1975. It hit number one on the US Billboard Hot 100 on February 7, 1976 (his only number one on that chart as a solo act), soaring from number ten the previous week, and remained there for three weeks; it topped the adult contemporary chart for two weeks. Overseas, on the UK Singles Chart, the song reached number 23 in January 1976. It was certified gold on March 11, 1976, and remained a best seller for nearly five months. Billboard ranked it as the No. 8 song of 1976.

Weekly charts

Year-end charts

Certifications

Personnel
 Paul Simon – vocals, acoustic guitar
 John Tropea, Hugh McCracken – electric guitars
 Tony Levin – bass guitar
 Kenny Ascher – Hammond organ
 Steve Gadd – drums
 Ralph MacDonald – tambourine, shaker
 Patti Austin – background vocals
 Valerie Simpson – background vocals
 Phoebe Snow – background vocals

Legacy
 Electronic group Plummet covered the song in 2005.
 The song was sampled by American rapper Common for his track "Forever Begins" on his 2007 album Finding Forever. 
 American Rapper Eminem sampled this song in an unreleased & leaked track named "50 Ways" in 2007.
 Fellow American musician Kid Cudi interpolated and sampled the song when he recorded his own rendition titled "50 Ways To Make A Record", taken from his debut mixtape A Kid Named Cudi (2008).
 The song was sampled by American rapper Ab-Soul for his track "A Rebellion" on his 2012 album  Control System.

See also
 Hot 100 number-one hits of 1976

References

External links
 Paul Simon biography
 
 
 
 

1975 singles
1976 singles
Paul Simon songs
Billboard Hot 100 number-one singles
Cashbox number-one singles
List songs
Songs written by Paul Simon
Song recordings produced by Paul Simon
Song recordings produced by Phil Ramone
1975 songs
Columbia Records singles